"Worldwide Choppers" is a song by American rapper Tech N9ne. It serves as the third single from his eleventh studio album All 6's and 7's. The song is noted for its breakneck flows packing rhythmic, rapid-fire rap.

"Worldwide Choppers", produced by Michael Summers known as producer Seven, is a multilingual track that includes lyrics in English, Danish and Turkish. Turkish lyrics are performed by Turkish rapper Ceza and Danish lyrics are performed by Danish rapper U$O. Other rappers taking part in the single are Busta Rhymes, Yelawolf, Twista, D-Loc, JL of B.Hood & Twisted Insane.

It was recorded with contributions from a number of locations, more specifically Kansas City, Missouri (JL), Kansas City, Kansas (D-Loc), Alabama (Yelawolf), Chicago (Twista), New York (Busta Rhymes), California (Twisted Insane) in addition to Turkey (Ceza) and Denmark (U$O). The names of the rappers and their locations are introduced within the recording by name.

Context
The word "chopper" relates to a type of fast-paced rap, a style of Midwest hip hop called chopper. In the late 1990s, Tech N9ne popularized the chopper style among his fan base. From 2007 to 2011, he released a number of songs in collaboration with other chopper-style artists exclusively in this fast-paced style of rap, including "Midwest Choppers" featuring the Midwest rappers D-Loc, Dalima and Krizz Kaliko (from his 2007's album Misery Loves Kompany), "Midwest Choppers 2" featuring K-Dean and Krayzie Bone (from his 2009's album Sickology 101) and "Worldwide Choppers" featuring several American and International artists in the same style on this album.

The word “chopper” refers to the unique sound helicopter blades produce while helicopters are in flight as an analogy to fast-paced rap. Twista's lyrics in the song allude to this: "I'm finna be usin it as energy, watch how radiant I'ma be. Like a helicopter when the words fly."
Chopper is also a word used in slang for an automatic firearm (which is used in reference to the same sound mentioned above). This may also be where the word chopper referencing the style of rap actually originated.

Music video
Tech N9ne and Yelawolf claimed in interviews that a music video was being shot for the song, but the video never entered production. This was due to the difficulty of having such a large group of artists available to film at the same time.

Sequel
A sequel titled "Speedom (WWC2)" is on Tech N9ne's album called Special Effects. The song features guest vocals from Krizz Kaliko and Eminem.

Chart performance
The single debuted on the US Billboard Bubbling Under Hot 100 Singles chart at number 4, effectively making it at number 104 on the US Billboard Hot 100. The song also appeared on the US Billboard Heatseekers Songs chart at number 15, becoming U$O's, Ceza's, JL's, Yelawolf's and Twisted Insane's biggest hit in the United States.

Charts and Certifications

References

External links

Lyrics of this song at Genius

2011 singles
Macaronic songs
Songs written by Busta Rhymes
Songs written by Twista
Tech N9ne songs
Twista songs
Busta Rhymes songs
Yelawolf songs
Songs written by Yelawolf
2011 songs